Pietro Paolo Baldini (1614?-1684?) was an Italian painter of the Baroque period.

Biography

Lived around the middle of the century XVII, the place of both birth and death are not known. Baldini was never taken into consideration by critics: only Lanzi (1789) pronounced a judgment on the basis of the works seen in the churches of Rome and in particular in St. Eustachio. He was active in mid 17th century in Rome, emerging as a pupil and one of the most faithful followers of Pietro da Cortona's style. He was nicknamed il Cortona, and sometimes called Pietro Paolo Ubaldini. He painted frescoes (1643) for the Lante Chapel of the church of San Nicola da Tolentino, Rome.
However, Baldini's works were not limited by Cortonesca culture, with "a precision that knew another school", as Lanzi pointed out, a school that declares itself unequivocally in Emilia.

References

Specific

1684 deaths
1614 births
17th-century Italian painters
Italian male painters
Italian Baroque painters